HMS Fawn was a Palmer three funnel, 30 knot destroyer ordered by the Royal Navy under the 1896 – 1897 Naval Estimates.  She was the fourth ship to carry this name.

Construction
Fawn was laid down on 5 September 1896 at the Palmer shipyard at Jarrow-on-Tyne and launched on 13 April 1897.  During her builder's trials she made her contracted speed requirement.  She was completed and accepted by the Royal Navy in December 1898.

Pre-War
Fawn spent her early operational career in Home Waters operating with the Channel Fleet as part of the Portsmouth Flotilla. Lieutenant Christopher Powell Metcalfe was in command from 15 January 1901, but was succeeded only two months later in March that year. She was commissioned at Portsmouth on 27 August 1901 by Lieutenant and Commander J. A. Ingles and assigned to the Channel Fleet.  On 2 April 1902 she was commissioned to relieve the destroyer  at the Mediterranean station, under the command of Lieutenant Robert W. Myburgh. She left Portsmouth in late May, arriving at Malta on 9 June 1902. In September 1902 she visited Nauplia with other ships of the fleet.
She returned to Home Waters in 1906.

On 30 August 1912, the Admiralty directed all destroyer classes were to be designated by alpha characters starting with the letter 'A'. After 30 September 1913, she was known as a C-class destroyer and had the letter ‘C’ painted on the hull below the bridge area and on either the fore or aft funnel.

World War I
In July 1914 Fawn was deployed in the 6th Destroyer Flotilla based at Dover. In November 1916 she was transferred to the 7th Flotilla on the Humber River. During her deployment there she was involved in anti-submarine and counter-mining patrols.

Disposition
In 1919 Fawn was paid off and laid-up in reserve awaiting disposal. She was sold on 23 July 1919 to Thos. W. Ward of Sheffield for breaking at New Holland, Lincolnshire, on the Humber Estuary.

She was awarded the Battle Honour Belgian Coast 1914 – 18 for her service.

Pennant numbers

References
Note:  All tabular data under General Characteristics only from the listed Jane's Fighting Ships volume unless otherwise specified

Bibliography
 
 
 
 
 
 
 
 

 

Ships built on the River Tyne
1897 ships
C-class destroyers (1913)
World War I destroyers of the United Kingdom